This article lists the results for the Thailand women's national volleyball team between 2010 and 2019.

2010

2011

2012

2013

2014

2015

2016

2017

2018

References

R
Women's volleyball in Thailand